The Glob (also known as Super Glob and Beastie Feastie) is an arcade video game released by Epos in 1983. It is a platform game where the player guides a strange, blue, glob-like creature named Toby through corridors and up and down elevators in search of snacks.

The Glob was only available as an unofficial conversion kit for Pac-Man and Ms. Pac-Man arcade machines.

Gameplay
An assortment of animals pursue Toby and fight him for control of the elevators. The player must avoid or stop them and eat a dozen different snacks to clear the 24 levels. A time limit(The Energy Level) increases the difficulty of the game.

Tutorial messages
"Meet the Glob"
"Munch all the snacks to clear the level"
"Push Call Button to ride Elevators"
"Use Energy to stick to Ceiling and drop down onto the Mob"
"Beware of the Mob: ...Gator, ...Froggy, ...Bunny, ...Monkey, ...Porker"

References

1983 video games
Arcade video games
Arcade-only video games
Platform games

simple:The Glob